This is a list of listed buildings in Aberdeenshire. The list is split out by parish.

 List of listed buildings in Aberchirder, Aberdeenshire
 List of listed buildings in Aberdour, Aberdeenshire
 List of listed buildings in Aboyne and Glen Tanar, Aberdeenshire
 List of listed buildings in Alford, Aberdeenshire
 List of listed buildings in Alvah, Aberdeenshire
 List of listed buildings in Arbuthnott, Aberdeenshire
 List of listed buildings in Auchindoir and Kearn, Aberdeenshire
 List of listed buildings in Auchterless, Aberdeenshire
 List of listed buildings in Ballater, Aberdeenshire
 List of listed buildings in Banchory, Aberdeenshire
 List of listed buildings in Banchory-Devenick, Aberdeenshire
 List of listed buildings in Banchory-Ternan, Aberdeenshire
 List of listed buildings in Banff, Aberdeenshire
 List of listed buildings in Belhelvie, Aberdeenshire
 List of listed buildings in Benholm, Aberdeenshire
 List of listed buildings in Bervie, Aberdeenshire
 List of listed buildings in Birse, Aberdeenshire
 List of listed buildings in Bourtie, Aberdeenshire
 List of listed buildings in Boyndie, Aberdeenshire
 List of listed buildings in Cairnie, Aberdeenshire
 List of listed buildings in Chapel of Garioch, Aberdeenshire
 List of listed buildings in Clatt, Aberdeenshire
 List of listed buildings in Cluny, Aberdeenshire
 List of listed buildings in Coull, Aberdeenshire
 List of listed buildings in Crathie and Braemar, Aberdeenshire
 List of listed buildings in Crimond, Aberdeenshire
 List of listed buildings in Cruden, Aberdeenshire
 List of listed buildings in Culsalmond, Aberdeenshire
 List of listed buildings in Daviot, Aberdeenshire
 List of listed buildings in Drumblade, Aberdeenshire
 List of listed buildings in Drumoak, Aberdeenshire
 List of listed buildings in Dunnottar, Aberdeenshire
 List of listed buildings in Durris, Aberdeenshire
 List of listed buildings in Echt, Aberdeenshire
 List of listed buildings in Ellon, Aberdeenshire
 List of listed buildings in Fettercairn, Aberdeenshire
 List of listed buildings in Fetteresso, Aberdeenshire
 List of listed buildings in Fintray, Aberdeenshire
 List of listed buildings in Fordoun, Aberdeenshire
 List of listed buildings in Fordyce, Aberdeenshire
 List of listed buildings in Forglen, Aberdeenshire
 List of listed buildings in Forgue, Aberdeenshire
 List of listed buildings in Foveran, Aberdeenshire
 List of listed buildings in Fraserburgh, Aberdeenshire
 List of listed buildings in Fyvie, Aberdeenshire
 List of listed buildings in Gamrie, Aberdeenshire
 List of listed buildings in Gartly, Aberdeenshire
 List of listed buildings in Garvock, Aberdeenshire
 List of listed buildings in Glass, Aberdeenshire
 List of listed buildings in Glenbervie, Aberdeenshire
 List of listed buildings in Glenbuchat, Aberdeenshire
 List of listed buildings in Glenmuick, Tullich and Glengairn, Aberdeenshire
 List of listed buildings in Huntly, Aberdeenshire
 List of listed buildings in Insch, Aberdeenshire
 List of listed buildings in Inverbervie, Aberdeenshire
 List of listed buildings in Inverkeithny, Aberdeenshire
 List of listed buildings in Inverurie, Aberdeenshire
 List of listed buildings in Keig, Aberdeenshire
 List of listed buildings in Keithhall and Kinkell, Aberdeenshire
 List of listed buildings in Kemnay, Aberdeenshire
 List of listed buildings in Kennethmont, Aberdeenshire
 List of listed buildings in Kildrummy, Aberdeenshire
 List of listed buildings in Kincardine O'Neil, Aberdeenshire
 List of listed buildings in Kinellar, Aberdeenshire
 List of listed buildings in King Edward, Aberdeenshire
 List of listed buildings in Kinneff and Catterline, Aberdeenshire
 List of listed buildings in Kintore, Aberdeenshire
 List of listed buildings in Laurencekirk, Aberdeenshire
 List of listed buildings in Leochel-Cushnie, Aberdeenshire
 List of listed buildings in Leslie, Aberdeenshire
 List of listed buildings in Logie Buchan, Aberdeenshire
 List of listed buildings in Logie-Coldstone, Aberdeenshire
 List of listed buildings in Longside, Aberdeenshire
 List of listed buildings in Lonmay, Aberdeenshire
 List of listed buildings in Lumphanan, Aberdeenshire
 List of listed buildings in Macduff, Aberdeenshire
 List of listed buildings in Marnoch, Aberdeenshire
 List of listed buildings in Maryculter, Aberdeenshire
 List of listed buildings in Marykirk, Aberdeenshire
 List of listed buildings in Meldrum, Aberdeenshire
 List of listed buildings in Methlick, Aberdeenshire
 List of listed buildings in Midmar, Aberdeenshire
 List of listed buildings in Monquhitter, Aberdeenshire
 List of listed buildings in Monymusk, Aberdeenshire
 List of listed buildings in New Deer, Aberdeenshire
 List of listed buildings in New Machar, Aberdeenshire
 List of listed buildings in Old Deer, Aberdeenshire
 List of listed buildings in Old Meldrum, Aberdeenshire
 List of listed buildings in Ordiquhill, Aberdeenshire
 List of listed buildings in Oyne, Aberdeenshire
 List of listed buildings in Peterhead, Aberdeenshire
 List of listed buildings in Pitsligo, Aberdeenshire
 List of listed buildings in Portsoy, Aberdeenshire
 List of listed buildings in Premney, Aberdeenshire
 List of listed buildings in Rathen, Aberdeenshire
 List of listed buildings in Rayne, Aberdeenshire
 List of listed buildings in Rhynie, Aberdeenshire
 List of listed buildings in Rosehearty, Aberdeenshire
 List of listed buildings in Skene, Aberdeenshire
 List of listed buildings in Slains, Aberdeenshire
 List of listed buildings in St Cyrus, Aberdeenshire
 List of listed buildings in St Fergus, Aberdeenshire
 List of listed buildings in Stonehaven, Aberdeenshire
 List of listed buildings in Strachan, Aberdeenshire
 List of listed buildings in Strathdon, Aberdeenshire
 List of listed buildings in Strichen, Aberdeenshire
 List of listed buildings in Tarland, Aberdeenshire
 List of listed buildings in Tarves, Aberdeenshire
 List of listed buildings in Tough, Aberdeenshire
 List of listed buildings in Towie, Aberdeenshire
 List of listed buildings in Tullynessle and Forbes, Aberdeenshire
 List of listed buildings in Turriff, Aberdeenshire
 List of listed buildings in Tyrie, Aberdeenshire
 List of listed buildings in Udny, Aberdeenshire

Aberdeenshire